Elections to Dungannon District Council were held on 21 May 1997 on the same day as the other Northern Irish local government elections. The election used four district electoral areas to elect a total of 22 councillors.

There was no change from the prior election.

Election results

Note: "Votes" are the first preference votes.

Districts summary

|- class="unsortable" align="centre"
!rowspan=2 align="left"|Ward
! % 
!Cllrs
! % 
!Cllrs
! %
!Cllrs
! %
!Cllrs
! % 
!Cllrs
! % 
!Cllrs
!rowspan=2|TotalCllrs
|- class="unsortable" align="center"
!colspan=2 bgcolor="" | UUP
!colspan=2 bgcolor="" | Sinn Féin
!colspan=2 bgcolor="" | SDLP
!colspan=2 bgcolor="" | DUP
!colspan=2 bgcolor="" | DL
!colspan=2 bgcolor="white"| Others
|-
|align="left"|Blackwater
|bgcolor="40BFF5"|43.2
|bgcolor="40BFF5"|3
|15.6
|0
|16.0
|1
|25.2
|1
|0.0
|0
|0.0
|0
|5
|-
|align="left"|Clogher Valley
|bgcolor="40BFF5"|33.2
|bgcolor="40BFF5"|2
|23.2
|1
|26.8
|1
|16.8
|1
|0.0
|0
|0.0
|0
|5
|-
|align="left"|Dungannon Town
|bgcolor="40BFF5"|31.0
|bgcolor="40BFF5"|2
|24.5
|1
|14.8
|1
|17.3
|1
|7.5
|1
|4.9
|0
|6
|-
|align="left"|Torrent
|16.7
|1
|bgcolor="#008800"|51.6
|bgcolor="#008800"|3
|15.4
|1
|0.0
|0
|0.0
|0
|16.3
|1
|6
|- class="unsortable" class="sortbottom" style="background:#C9C9C9"
|align="left"| Total
|30.3
|8
|30.0
|5
|18.2
|4
|14.0
|3
|1.7
|1
|5.8
|1
|22
|-
|}

District results

Blackwater

1993: 3 x UUP, 1 x DUP, 1 x SDLP
1997: 3 x UUP, 1 x DUP, 1 x SDLP
1993-1997 Change: No change

Clogher Valley

1993: 2 x UUP, 1 x SDLP, 1 x Sinn Féin, 1 x DUP
1997: 2 x UUP, 1 x SDLP, 1 x Sinn Féin, 1 x DUP
1993-1997 Change: No change

Dungannon Town

1993: 2 x UUP, 1 x Sinn Féin, 1 x DUP, 1 x SDLP, 1 x Democratic Left
1997: 2 x UUP, 1 x Sinn Féin, 1 x DUP, 1 x SDLP, 1 x Democratic Left
1993-1997 Change: No change

Torrent

1993: 3 x Sinn Féin, 1 x SDLP, 1 x UUP, 1 x Independent Nationalist
1997: 3 x Sinn Féin, 1 x SDLP, 1 x UUP, 1 x Independent Nationalist
1993-1997 Change: No change

References

Dungannon and South Tyrone Borough Council elections
Dungannon and South Tyrone